

L 

 
 
 
 
 
 
 
 
 
 
 1008 La Paz
 
 1029 La Plata
 164589 La Sagra
 
 2187 La Silla
 
 
 
 
 
 
 
 
 336 Lacadiera
 
 
 
 
 
 120 Lachesis
 
 208 Lacrimosa
 1851 Lacroute
 
 
 
 
 
 
 
 
 
 11252 Laërtes
 39 Laetitia
 
 
 
 
 
 
 
 
 
 
 
 
 
 
 
 
 1006 Lagrangea
 1412 Lagrula
 
 
 
 
 
 
 
 
 
 
 
 
 
 
 822 Lalage
 
 
 
 
 
 
 
 
 
 187 Lamberta
 
 
 
 
 
 
 248 Lameia
 
 
 
 
 
 
 393 Lampetia
 1767 Lampland
 
 
 
 
 12373 Lancearmstrong
 
 
 
 
 
 
 
 
 
 
 
 
 
 
 
 
 
 
 
 
 
 
 
 
 
 
 
 
 
 
 
 
 
 
 683 Lanzia
 3240 Laocoon
 1011 Laodamia
 507 Laodica
 
 
 
 
 
 
 
 
 
 
 1504 Lappeenranta
 8441 Lapponica
 
 
 
 
 
 
 
 
 
 1162 Larissa
 
 
 
 
 
 
 
 
 
 
 
 
 
 
 
 
 
 
 
 
 
 
 
 
 
 
 
 
 
 
 
 639 Latona
 
 
 1284 Latvia
 
 
 
 
 1597 Laugier
 
 7167 Laupheim
 467 Laura
 
 
 
 
 
 
 
 
 
 
 2865 Laurel
 
 51827 Laurelclark
 
 
 
 
 
 
 
 
 162 Laurentia
 
 
 
 
 
 
 
 1938 Lausanna
 
 
 
 
 
 
 
 
 
 
 
 
 
 
 
 
 
 
 
 
 
 
 
 
 
 
 
 
 
 
 
 
 
 
 
 
 
 
 
 
 
 
 
 
 
 
 
 
 
 
 
 7958 Leakey
 
 
 
 
 
 
 
 
 
 
 
 
 
 
 
 
 
 
 
 
 
 
 
 38 Leda
 
 
 
 
 
 
 
 
 
 
 
 
 
 
 
 
 
 
 
 
 
 
 
 
 
 
 
 
 
 1261 Legia
 
 
 691 Lehigh
 
 
 
 
 
 
 
 9223 Leifandersson
 
 
 
 
 
 
 6545 Leitus
 
 541132 Leleākūhonua
 
 
 
 
 
 
 1565 Lemaître
 
 
 
 
 
 
 
 
 47171 Lempo
 
 789 Lena
 
 
 
 
 
 
 
 
 2046 Leningrad
 
 
 
 4147 Lennon
 
 
 
 
 969 Leocadia
 
 
 
 
 
 319 Leona
 
 
 3000 Leonardo
 
 1378 Leonce
 
 9903 Leonhardt
 
 
 
 728 Leonisis
 
 
 696 Leonora
 
 
 
 3793 Leonteus
 844 Leontina
 
 
 
 893 Leopoldina
 
 
 
 
 
 
 
 
 
 
 
 
 
 
 
 
 
 
 
 
 
 
 
 
 
 
 
 
 
 1264 Letaba
 
 
 
 68 Leto
 
 
 
 
 
 
 
 11351 Leucus
 
 35 Leukothea
 
 
 1361 Leuschneria
 
 
 6170 Levasseur
 1997 Leverrier
 
 
 
 
 
 
 
 
 
 
 
 3673 Levy
 
 
 
 
 
 
 
 
 
 
 
 
 
 2004 Lexell
 
 
 
 
 
 
 
 954 Li
 
 
 
 
 
 
 
 
 
 
 
 
 771 Libera
 
 
 125 Liberatrix
 
 
 
 
 264 Libussa
 1268 Libya
 
 
 
 
 
 
 
 
 1951 Lick
 1107 Lictoria
 
 
 3322 Lidiya
 
 
 
 
 
 
 
 
 
 
 
 
 
 
 
 356 Liguria
 
 
 
 
 
 
 
 
 
 213 Lilaea
 
 
 
 
 
 
 1181 Lilith
 1092 Lilium
 
 756 Lilliana
 
 
 
 
 1003 Lilofee
 
 
 
 
 
 
 1383 Limburgia
 
 
 
 
 1490 Limpopo
 
 
 468 Lina
 
 
 
 
 
 
 
 
 
 
 
 
 
 
 
 
 
 
 
 
 
 
 
 1407 Lindelöf
 828 Lindemannia
 
 3204 Lindgren
 
 
 
 
 
 
 
 
 
 118401 LINEAR
 
 
 
 
 
 
 
 
 
 
 
 
 
 
 
 
 
 
 
 
 
 
 
 
 
 1469 Linzia
 974 Lioba
 
 
 
 
 
 
 
 
 846 Lipperta
 
 
 
 414 Liriope
 
 
 
 
 
 
 
 
 
 
 
 
 
 
 
 
 
 
 
 
 
 
 
 
 
 
 
 
 
 
 
 2577 Litva
 
 
 
 
 
 
 
 
 
 
 
 
 
 
 
 
 
 
 
 3556 Lixiaohua
 
 
 
 
 
 
 1062 Ljuba
 
 
 
 
 1858 Lobachevskij
 1066 Lobelia
 
 
 
 
 
 
 
 
 
 
 
 
 
 
 
 
 
 
 58534 Logos
 
 
 
 
 
 
 
 
 
 463 Lola
 
 
 
 
 117 Lomia
 
 1379 Lomonosowa
 
 
 
 
 
 
 
 
 
 
 
 
 
 
 
 
 
 
 
 
 
 
 
 
 1755 Lorbach
 1287 Lorcia
 
 165 Loreley
 
 
 
 
 
 
 
 
 1939 Loretta
 
 
 
 
 
 
 
 
 
 
 
 
 
 
 
 1114 Lorraine
 
 
 
 10476 Los Molinos
 
 
 
 
 
 
 
 429 Lotis
 
 
 
 
 
 
 
 
 
 
 
 
 
 
 
 
 868 Lova
 
 
 
 
 
 
 
 
 
 
 
 
 
 4045 Lowengrub
 
 
 
 
 
 
 
 1431 Luanda
 
 
 
 
 
 
 
 
 
 
 
 
 
 
 
 
 
 
 
 
 
 
 21509 Lucascavin
 
 
 
 
 
 
 
 
 
 
 23327 Luchernandez
 
 222 Lucia
 
 15817 Lucianotesi
 1176 Lucidor
 
 
 
 1930 Lucifer
 146 Lucina
 
 281 Lucretia
 
 
 
 
 
 1158 Luda
 
 
 
 
 
 675 Ludmilla
 
 
 292 Ludovica
 
 
 
 
 1936 Lugano
 1133 Lugduna
 
 
 
 
 
 
 
 
 
 
 
 
 
 
 
 
 599 Luisa
 
 
 3844 Lujiaxi
 
 
 
 
 
 
 
 
 
 145523 Lulin
 
 141 Lumen
 
 775 Lumière
 
 
 
 
 1067 Lunaria
 
 809 Lundia
 1334 Lundmarka
 
 
 
 
 
 
 
 
 
 
 
 
 
 
 713 Luscinia
 
 
 
 
 
 
 21 Lutetia
 
 1303 Luthera
 
 
 
 5430 Luu
 
 
 
 
 
 4776 Luyi
 
 
 
 
 
 
 
 
 9694 Lycomedes
 110 Lydia
 
 1028 Lydina
 917 Lyka
 4792 Lykaon
 
 
 
 
 
 
 4358 Lynn
 
 
 
 
 
 
 
 
 
 
 
 
 
 
 
 
 
 897 Lysistrata
 
 
 
 
 
 
 2204 Lyyli

See also 
 List of minor planet discoverers
 List of observatory codes

References 
 

Lists of minor planets by name